Soleilmont is a Charleroi Metro station located in Gilly, Belgium (part of the Charleroi municipality), opened on 27 February 2012 as part of the Soleilmont extension of the Gilly branch of the Charleroi Metro. The station, built at ground level, is the terminus of the Gilly branch (line M4) and is an intermodal transport hub served by trams and buses and featuring a 200 spaces car park.

The station is located in TEC Charleroi fare zone 2.

As the terminus of the Gilly branch of the network, the station features a loop track allowing trams to make a U-turn to start their journey back to Charleroi.

Nearby points of interest 

The station is located in a mixed residential/commercial area of Gilly (the Soleilmont neighbourhood).

Interchange 

TEC Charleroi bus lines 17, 25, 62, 722

See also 

 List of Charleroi Metro stations

References

Charleroi Metro stations
Railway stations opened in 2012